Varibaculum anthropi is a Gram-positive and strictly anaerobic bacterium from the genus of Varibaculum which has been isolated from human urine from Gothenburg in Sweden.

References

External links
Type strain of Varibaculum anthropi at BacDive -  the Bacterial Diversity Metadatabase

Actinomycetales
Bacteria described in 2017